The Christmas Meeting of 1888 (Faroese: Jólafundurin 1888) is considered to be the official start of the Faroese National Movement.

On December 22, 1888 the only newspaper at that time in the Faroe Islands, Dimmalætting, carried the following notice:
are invited to gather in the house of Parliament on the second day of
Christmas at 3 o’clock in the afternoon where we will discuss
how to defend the Faroese language and Faroese traditions.
The invitation, signed by nine prominent Faroemen, marked the inception of a new era in Faroese history - the rise of the National Movement.

In spite of a raging storm and slushy roads, a large crowd of people gathered in the house of the Løgting that afternoon. Speeches were made and patriotic songs were sung. The highlight of the meeting came when the poet Rasmus Effersøe recited a battle hymn written for the occasion by young Jóannes Patursson. The message of the lengthy poem was evident in the first stanza:

Now the hour has come,
when we must join hands
and rally around
our native tongue.

Resolution 
The meeting ended with the acceptance of a six-point resolution:
 As soon as there were enough Faroese schoolbooks available, Faroese should be used as an educational language in schools.
 In history, the emphasis must be on Faroese national history.
 In religion, all Danish rote learning should be abolished and the subject matter rendered in Faroese.
 Priests must be free to use Faroese in and outside the Church.
 Faroese should be used for all official ends and purposes.
 Finally, the resolution stressed the necessity of establishing a Faroese Folk High School.

Stamps 
Bárður Jákupsson made the stamps above right which show the nine people who sent out the invitation to the Christmas Meeting in 1888.

 3.00 kr stamp – Notice in Dimmalætting December 22 1888, which is mentioned in the text.
 3.20 kr stamp – Drawing of meeting in Reynsmúlalág in 1908 by William Heinesen.
 12.00 kr stamp – First verse of poem by Jóannes Patursson.

References

External links

 Nú er tann stundin komin til handa

History of the Faroe Islands
Faroese nationalism
1888 in Denmark
1888 conferences
December 1888 events